The 2018–19 SC Freiburg season was the 115th season in the football club's history and 3rd consecutive and 19th overall season in the top flight of German football, the Bundesliga, having been promoted from the 2. Bundesliga in 2016. In addition to the domestic league, SC Freiburg also participated in this season's edition of the domestic cup, the DFB-Pokal. This was the 64th season for Freiburg in the Schwarzwald-Stadion, located in Freiburg, Baden-Württemberg, Germany. The season covered a period from 1 July 2018 to 30 June 2019.

Players

Squad information

Friendly matches

Competitions

Overview

Bundesliga

League table

Results summary

Results by round

Matches

DFB-Pokal

Statistics

Appearances and goals

|-
!colspan="14" style="background:#dcdcdc;text-align:center"| Goalkeepers

|-
!colspan="14" style="background:#dcdcdc;text-align:center"| Defenders

|-
!colspan="14" style="background:#dcdcdc; text-align:center"|Midfielders

|-
!colspan="14" style=background:#dcdcdc;text-align:center"|Forwards

|-
! colspan=14 style=background:#dcdcdc; text-align:center| Players transferred out during the season

References

SC Freiburg seasons
Freiburg